The Isaac Onderdonk House, also known as the Walter C. and Julia Meuly House, is a historic house located along River Road in Piscataway, New Jersey. It was added to the National Register of Historic Places on October 30, 1973. It is also a contributing property of the Road Up Raritan Historic District.

References

National Register of Historic Places in Middlesex County, New Jersey
Houses on the National Register of Historic Places in New Jersey
Piscataway, New Jersey
Houses in Middlesex County, New Jersey
New Jersey Register of Historic Places